Lesko is a town in Poland, and the capital of Lesko County. Lesko may also refer to
Lesko Stone, a rock formation near the city of Lesko 
Gmina Lesko, an administrative district in Lesko County
Łęsko, a village in Poland
Lesko (surname)